Post-Tridentine Mass may refer to:

 Tridentine Mass
 Preconciliar rites after the Second Vatican Council
 Mass of Paul VI
 Zaire Use

See also 

 Council of Trent